Emilio Simeon Allué Carcasona, SDB (18 February 1935 – 26 April 2020) was a Spanish-born American prelate of the Catholic Church. He served as an auxiliary bishop of the Archdiocese of Boston until his retirement in 2010.

Life and ministry
Born in Huesca, Spain, on 18 February 1935, Emilio Allué made his profession as a Salesian in 1962 and attended Don Bosco College in Newton, New Jersey. He then furthered his studies at the Salesian Pontifical University in Rome, where he was ordained to the priesthood on 22 December 1966.

He earned a Licentiate of Sacred Theology from the Salesian University in 1967, and was director of the Salesian Seminary in Goshen, New York, from 1972 to 1975. He received a Ph.D. in the history of Christianity from Fordham University in 1981, and later served as parish vicar for Hispanic ministry at Mary Help of Christians Church in New York.

On 24 July 1996, Allué was appointed Auxiliary Bishop of Boston and Titular Bishop of Croae by Pope John Paul II. He received his episcopal consecration on the following 17 September from Cardinal Bernard Francis Law, with Archbishop Theodore McCarrick and Bishop Robert Banks serving as co-consecrators.

As an auxiliary, Allué served as regional bishop of the Merrimack Pastoral Region and episcopal vicar for the Hispanic apostolate.

In 2002, Allué was named in a sexual abuse lawsuit claiming that he ignored credible allegations of abuse by priests during his tenure in 1972 as director of a junior seminary in Goshen, New York. One allegation involved his efforts to expel a student rather than confront the alleged abuser. 

Allué died on 26 April 2020 in Boston, after contracting COVID-19 during the COVID-19 pandemic in Boston.

See also
 

 Catholic Church hierarchy
 Catholic Church in the United States
 Historical list of the Catholic bishops of the United States
 List of Catholic bishops of the United States
 Lists of patriarchs, archbishops, and bishops

References

External links
 Archdiocese of Boston website

Episcopal succession

1935 births
2020 deaths
Spanish emigrants to the United States
Fordham University alumni
People from Huesca
Salesians of Don Bosco
Salesian bishops
Roman Catholic Archdiocese of Boston
Salesian Pontifical University alumni
Religious leaders from Massachusetts
21st-century Roman Catholic bishops in the United States
20th-century Roman Catholic bishops in the United States
Deaths from the COVID-19 pandemic in Massachusetts